Neville Stuart Talbot MC (21 August 1879 – 3 April 1943) was Bishop of Pretoria in the Anglican Church of Southern Africa and later a robust vicar of St. Mary's Church, Nottingham and assistant Bishop of Southwell who turned down the chance to be Bishop of Croydon. He was born at Keble College, Oxford, and died at Henfield, Sussex.

Family 

He was the third child and second son of his parents. His father, Edward Stuart Talbot, a younger son of a younger son of the house of Shrewsbury was the first Warden of Keble College, Oxford, and later Vicar of Leeds, and thereafter successively Bishop of Rochester, Southwark and Winchester. His mother, Lavinia Talbot, was a promoter of women's education.

Neville had two brothers, the elder of whom, Edward, was to join the Community of the Resurrection, and the younger, Gilbert, was to be killed in action in the Ypres Salient in 1915. Of his sisters, Mary married Lionel Ford, the Headmaster of Repton and Harrow and later Dean of York, while Lavinia was after his wife's death to keep house for him and bring up his children.

Schooling 

When Neville was nine his family moved to Leeds. Neville attended the Grammar School, and then was at Haileybury from 1892 to 1899.

Military service 

He joined the Army in 1898, just in time for the Boer War. Military life had an attraction for certain sides of Neville's character. It appealed to a certain simplicity in him and the need for courage. Neville was inclined to go straight at things, without weighing the risk. He blurted out untimely truths. The discipline of the Army did not affect him much. The Boer War was not a very good school for that. Much of it was like a shooting party, and the hazardous self-exposure in the clear air of the veldt remained his first taste of danger.

Education 

Neville went up to Christ Church, Oxford, in October 1903. While at Oxford, he played one first-class cricket match for Oxford University as a lower-order batsman and opening bowler. In the winter of 1907 he went to Cuddesdon for his ordination training.

Clerical career 

Talbot was made deacon at Ripon Cathedral on 14 June 1908. He was an assistant curate at St. Bartholomew's Church, Armley, from 1908 to 1909. He was ordained priest in Lent 1909 and went to be Chaplain of Balliol College, Oxford, in October. During the World War I he served as a military chaplain (4th Class), he was later Assistant Chaplain-General to the Fifth Army.

In April 1918 he was married to Cecil Mary Eastwood by his father at West Stoke Church, near Chichester.

Pretoria 

On 12 April 1920 he was elected Bishop of Pretoria, in succession to Bishop Furse, and was consecrated in St. Paul's Cathedral on St John the Baptist's Day. Among the bishops who took part in the consecration were his own father, then Bishop of Winchester, the Archbishop of Cape Town, and his predecessor in the Diocese of Pretoria, Bishop Michael Furse.

In 1930 he refused the appointment as Bishop of Newcastle, New South Wales.

Nottingham 

He was appointed to St. Mary's Church, Nottingham, in 1933 and an Assistant Bishop of Southwell the next year. Neville used to refer to St. Mary's as St. Pelican in the Wilderness. This is explained by the comment of a priest in the diocese:

The parish was largely non-residential, and the church was surrounded by factories and offices which Neville used to visit carrying handbills announcing the special dinner-hour service.

Neville was in excellent relations with the non-Anglican religious bodies in Nottingham. In co-operation with John Francis McNulty, the Roman Catholic Bishop of Nottingham, and Mr James, the Free Church leader, he helped to create the Nottinghamshire Christian Council, which owed much to the combination in Neville of an outspoken loyalty to his convictions with a warm spirit of fraternity.

In May 1941, Neville wrote from Nottingham :

Neville was often restless within the conditions of his restriction in his parish at Nottingham – restrictions greatly increased by the war. He likened himself to "an old hulk stranded on a lee-shore". His fearless honesty made him accuse himself of ambition, but, if it was there, it did not lurk in any secret corner. In March 1939 he was offered the position of Bishop of Croydon. He would have been Suffragan and Archdeacon as well as Vicar. His first feeling was that he must accept. He felt that nine years in Nottingham were enough, and that "the call came from the Church and not from Downing Street." However, after inspecting conditions on the spot, he decided against.

With the coming of the war, there seemed to open out at last the chance for work that suited his gifts. It arose out of his interest in the Royal Air Force . In January 1941, he took a four days' mission for them at Cranwell, and in 1942 he took a mission in the Royal Air Force depot at Donington. Such experiences convinced him that far more was needed on the spiritual side in the Chaplains' department, and he began a long and unwearied bombardment of the authorities (military and ecclesiastical). He visited C. S. Lewis at Magdalen College, Oxford, staying overnight on 5 November 1941 for conversation between two men who were both involved in the RAF, Lewis as a lecturer. In November 1942, the two archbishops wrote to inform him that he had been appointed as one of the seven men that were to give the greater part of the time to visiting Air Force centres. On 9 December he wrote that he was to start on 12 January 1943. However, just when the direction of his life was moving in a direction that would more suitable employ his talents, came the tragic collapse. On 12 December 1942 he had a severe heart-attack, from which he never recovered.

He retired to Sussex for convalescence where he died. He was buried at All Hallows Barking, the religious headquarters of Toc H.

References

External links 
 
 Bibliographic directory from Project Canterbury
 
 
 

1879 births
1943 deaths
People from Oxford
20th-century English Anglican priests
Alumni of Christ Church, Oxford
20th-century Anglican Church of Southern Africa bishops
Vicars of St Mary's Church, Nottingham
Anglican bishops of Pretoria
Oxford University cricketers
World War I chaplains
Lyttelton family
Presidents of the Oxford Union
Recipients of the Military Cross
People from Henfield
Royal Army Chaplains' Department officers
British Army personnel of World War I